Hamzabey can refer to:

 Hamzabey, Bolu
 Hamzabey, İnegöl
 Hamzabey, Lüleburgaz
 Hamzabey, Yeniçağa